Ernst Rutschmann (born 9 November 1948) is a former Swiss football player. During his career he played for FC Winterthur, FC Zürich, FC Gossau and  FC Wettingen.

He made 8 appearances for the Switzerland national team between 1970 and 1975.

Honours

Club
FC Zürich
Swiss Super League (3): 1973–74, 1974–75, 1975–76
Swiss Cup (3) 1971-72, 1972–73, 1975–76

References

1948 births
Living people
Swiss men's footballers
Switzerland international footballers
Association football defenders
FC Zürich players
FC Winterthur players
FC Gossau players
FC Wettingen players
Swiss Super League players
People from Winterthur
Sportspeople from the canton of Zürich